Simferopol City Municipality (officially "the territory governed by the Simferopol city council") is one of the 25 regions of the Crimean peninsula in Ukraine currently occupied by Russia. Population:

Administrative divisions

The Simferopol City Municipality's territory is subdivided into 3 urban raions (urban districts): 
Kyivsky District
Tsentralnyi District
Zheleznodorozhny District

Besides the Crimean capital Simferopol, the region includes:
4 towns
Hresivskyi
Aeroflotskyi
Komsomolske
Ahrarne

1 village
Bitumne

References

External links
 

 
Municipalities of Crimea